The José Iturbi International Music Competition is a music competition named after the Spanish piano virtuoso José Iturbi. It was established by the José Iturbi Foundation in 2007 and takes place at the University of California Los Angeles. The competition has two tracks: one for pianists and the other for opera singers. The competition is open to pianists and singers of all nationalities between the ages of 17 and 35. The competition's co-founder, Donelle Dadidgan, is the founder of the Hollywood Museum and the goddaughter of José Iturbi. Initially held annually from 2007 to 2010, the next competition was scheduled in 2013.

Prizes
Cash prizes are awarded to the winners, with $50,000 going to the First Prize winners in the piano and voice competitions. The competition also awards the "Spanish Prize", the "American Prize", and the "People's Choice Award".

Judges
The competition has separate judges for the piano and voice sections. The following were the judges for the 2010 competition:
Piano
Concert pianists Daniel Pollack (Chairman) and Ilana Vered, conductors Jorge Mester and Lalo Schifrin, and Los Angeles Times music critic Mark Swed
Voice
Former Director of Columbia Artists Management vocal division Matthew Epstein (Chairman) and opera singers David Daniels, Marilyn Horne, Carol Vaness, and Peter Kazaras

Past First Prize winners

Piano
2007 Rufus Choi
2008 Maria Kim
2009 Dmitri Levkovich
2010 Stanislav Khristenko

Voice
2007 Karen Slack, soprano
2008 Angela Meade, soprano
2009 Leah Crocetto, soprano
2010 Sasha Cooke, mezzo-soprano

References

External links
Official Website

Piano competitions
Opera competitions
Music competitions in Spain